National Film Award for Best Director is the highest award for film directors in Bangladesh, presented annually at Bangladesh National Film Awards ceremony by the Ministry of Information. It is given in honour of a film director who has exhibited excellence directing in Bangladeshi cinema. Since 1975, the award is given annually except in 1981, 1998 and 2003. It is presented by the President of Bangladesh at a ceremony held in Dhaka.

The 1st National Film Awards ceremony was held in 1976, and Narayan Ghosh Mita was the first awardee of this category for directing the film Lathial (1975).

Since its inception, a total of 43 awards have been given to 32 directors. A. J. Mintu has received the most awards in this category with four, following Sheikh Niamat Ali three times. 2017 best director, producer & Screenplay writer Reazul Rezu. As of the 2019 ceremony, Mostafizur Rahman Manik is the recent winner in this category for the film Jannat' (2018).

List of winners

Key

Multiple wins
The following individuals have won multiple Best Director awards:

Diversity of nominees/winners
Female nominees/winners
Shuchanda is a solo winner of this category in the 30th Bangladesh National Film Awards for the film Hajar Bachhor Dhore''.

See also
 Bangladesh National Film Award for Best Film

Notes

References

Sources

 
 
 
 
 
 
 

Director
National Film Awards (Bangladesh)